Mireia Benito Pellicer (born 30 December 1996) is a Spanish professional racing cyclist, who currently rides for UCI Women's Continental Team . In May 2022, when she was racing for UCI Women's Continental Team , she became the first rider of the team to get on the podium of a UCI Women's World Tour race, when she was awarded the combativity prize at Itzulia Women.

References

External links
 

1996 births
Living people
Spanish female cyclists
Place of birth missing (living people)
People from Baix Penedès
Sportspeople from the Province of Tarragona
Cyclists from Catalonia
21st-century Spanish women